Xu Zizhou (born 8 January 1981) is a Chinese former track and field sprinter. His personal best of 45.25 seconds for the 400 metres is the Chinese record for the event. He was the 400 m bronze medallist at the Asian Athletics Championships in 2000 and secured a gold medal at the 2001 East Asian Games.

He broke Chinese youth and junior records for the 400 m and was highly successful at the start of his career, representing China at the 1998 World Junior Championships in Athletics and winning the 400 m title at the 1998 World Youth Games. He was a five-time Chinese champion (four times over 400 m, once in 200 metres) and took a 200/400 m double at the National Games of China in 2001. Despite early success, he retired early in his career, ceasing to compete at age 24.

Career
Born in Hepu County, Guangxi, Xu began his career as a 400 metres specialist. At the age of sixteen he was runner-up in that event at the 8th National Games of China with a Chinese youth record of 46.01 seconds. He won his first national title the following year at the 1998 Chinese Athletics Championships – the first of three consecutive Chinese titles. His debut global performance came at the 1998 World Youth Games, where he was the 400 m champion as well as the gold medallist in the 4×400 metres relay. An appearance at the 1998 World Junior Championships in Athletics came the next month, but there he failed to make the finals of either the 200 m or 400 m. Xu also claimed the 400 m title at the 1999 Chinese City Games. He was 200 metres runner-up at the 1999 Chinese Championships then claimed a 200/400 m double at the 2000 national event. He set Chinese junior records of 20.62 seconds for the 200 m and 45.55 seconds for the 400 m that year. His first international medal came at the 2000 Asian Athletics Championships, where he took the 400 m bronze.

Xu's best performances came in the 2001 season. A Chinese national record run of 45.25 seconds came at the 2001 East Asian Games, which brought him the gold medal and also a games record. His was a 200/400 m double champion at the 9th Chinese Games, setting his personal best of 20.60 seconds in the 200 m final. The 2001 Universiade was hosted in Beijing that year and Xu took fourth in the 200 m in the Chinese capital.

His 2002 was less successful: he mainly focused on the 200 m and the highlights of his season were a runner-up finish at the national championships and a fifth place at the 2002 Asian Games in a season's best of 20.77 seconds. He returned to his specialist event the following year and claimed his fourth 400 m national title at the Chinese Championships. His performances began to diminish from that year on. He was third in the 200 m at the 2004 national championships, but did not make it to the semi-finals of the 400 m. In his final year of competition in 2005 he won the 200 m title at the Asian University Athletics Championships, and was a semi-finalist in that event at the national championships. In his last major national event he helped Guangdong to the 4×400 m relay title, but did not go beyond the 200 m heats individually. This marked the end of his athletic career.

References

External links

Living people
1981 births
Runners from Guangxi
Chinese male sprinters
Athletes (track and field) at the 2002 Asian Games
Asian Games competitors for China
People from Beihai
20th-century Chinese people
21st-century Chinese people